Bianca Emmelie Elisabeth Salming (born 22 November 1998) is a Swedish athlete who competes in heptathlon. She has won several Swedish Championship gold as a youth. She has competed for Täby IS. And since 2017 she competes for Turebergs FK. She also competes in long jump.

Career
She placed fourth in heptathlon at the Junior World Championship in 2016.

She competed for Sweden in the 2018 European Athletics Championships in Berlin.

Personal life
Salming grew up in Vaxholm and currently resides in Stockholm. She is the daughter of late ice hockey player Börje Salming.

References

External links 

Living people
1998 births
Athletes from Stockholm
Swedish heptathletes
Swedish Athletics Championships winners